Léon Jeck (8 February 1947 – 24 June 2007) was a Belgian international footballer. He was a tough-tackling centre-back for Standard Liège and played against Russia and Mexico in the 1970 World Cup Finals. It was Jeck's tackle that was controversially given as a penalty in the Mexico game that helped the hosts, not Belgium, progress to the next stage. He died on 23 June 2007 at the age of 60 from a pulmonary embolism.

References

External links

1947 births
2007 deaths
People from Ans, Belgium
Belgian footballers
Belgium international footballers
1970 FIFA World Cup players
Standard Liège players
Belgian Pro League players
Deaths from pulmonary embolism
Association football defenders
Footballers from Liège Province